John Edward Halford "Hal" Hooker (6 March 1898 – 12 February 1982) was an Australian first class cricketer who played for New South Wales. A tall fast-medium bowler, he stood at 6 ft and was capable of swinging the ball both ways.

In 1928/29 he became the first player to take four wickets in successive balls in a Sheffield Shield match.

He is the holder of the world record 10th wicket stand in first class cricket, making 307 with Alan Kippax. Coming in at number 11, Hooker batted for almost five hours and made 62.

After retiring from cricket Hooker became a sports broadcaster. In 1946, he was reporting for the BBC Light Programme on the 1946–47 Ashes series.

See also
 List of New South Wales representative cricketers

References

External links 

 

1898 births
1982 deaths
Australian cricketers
New South Wales cricketers
Cricketers from Queensland